Mount Harwood is the first summit east of Mount San Antonio. The United States Geological Survey recognized the name to honor California educator and conservationist Aurelia Squire Harwood in 1965. Prior to this, the peak now known as Thunder Mountain was also referred to as Mount Harwood. Mount Harwood is located on the East side of the San Gabriel Mountains in the Angeles National Forest near the San Bernardino-Los Angeles county border. In this area of the San Gabriel Mountains the peaks are the highest. Because of the elevation Mount Harwood turns out to be ranked the 4th highest peak in the San Gabriel mountains after Dawson Peak, Mount San Antonio or "Old Baldy" being the highest at 10,064 feet (3,068 m). The only way for hikers or tourists to access Mount Harwood is to take Mt. Baldy Road off I-210. A National Forest Adventure pass/ National Park access pass must be displayed on a vehicle to access Mount Harwood.

Gallery

References 

San Gabriel Mountains
Mountains of San Bernardino County, California
Mountains of Southern California